The men's discus throw event at the 2002 World Junior Championships in Athletics was held in Kingston, Jamaica, at National Stadium on 17 and 18 July.  A 1.75 kg (junior implement) discus was used.

Medalists

Results

Final
18 July

Qualifications
17 Jul

Group A

Group B

Participation
According to an unofficial count, 34 athletes from 28 countries participated in the event.

References

Discus throw
Discus throw at the World Athletics U20 Championships